This is a discography for albums released by Motorcity Records.

Album discography
Unissued albums are marked with an (NR) for '"not released".
MOTCLP  1 - Various Artists - Motortown Sound of Detroit Vol. 1 (1989)
MOTCLP  2 - Various Artists - Motortown Sound of Detroit Vol. 2 (1990)
MOTCLP  3 - Various Artists - Motortown Sound of Detroit Vol. 3 (1990)
MOTCLP  4 - Various Artists - Motortown Sound of Detroit Vol. 4 (1990)
CDMOTCLP  5 - Various Artists - Motortown Sound of Detroit Vol. 5 (1991)
MOTCCD 6 - Various Artists - Motortown Sound of Detroit Vol. 6 (1992)
MOTCCD 7 - Various Artists - Motortown Sound of Detroit Vol. 7 (1992)
MOTCCD 8 - Various Artists - Motortown Sound of Detroit Vol. 8 (NR)
MOTCCD 9 - Various Artists - Motortown Sound of Detroit Vol. 9 (NR)
MOTCCD 10 - Various Artists - Motortown Sound of Detroit Vol. 10 (NR)
MOTCLP 11 - Various Artists - Motorcity Soul Sampler Vol. 1 (1989)
MOTCLP 12 - Various Artists - Motorcity Soul Sampler Vol. 2 (1990)
MOTCLP 13 - Various Artists - Motorcity Soul Sampler Vol. 3 (1990)
MOTCLP 14 - Various Artists - Motorcity Soul Sampler Vol. 4 (1990)
MOTCCD 15 - Various Artists - Motorcity Soul Sampler Vol. 5 (NR)
MOTCCD 16 - Various Artists - Motorcity Soul Sampler Vol. 6 (NR)
MOTCCD 17 - Various Artists - Motorcity Soul Sampler Vol. 7 (NR)
MOTCCD 18 - Various Artists - Motorcity Soul Sampler Vol. 8 (NR)
MOTCCD 19 - Various Artists - Motorcity Soul Sampler Vol. 9 (NR)
MOTCCD 20 - Various Artists - Motorcity Soul Sampler Vol. 10 (NR)
MOTCLP 21 - Various Artists - 20 Detroit Chartbusters Vol. 1 (1990)
MOTCLP 22 - Various Artists - Girl Groups Of The Motorcity (1990)
MOTCLP 23 - Various Artists - 20 Detroit Chartbusters Vol. 2 (1990)
CDMOTCLP 24 - Various Artists - 20 Detroit Chartbusters Vol. 3 (1991)
MOTCLP 25 / CDMOTCLP 25 - Various Artists - Male Groups Of The Motorcity (1990)
MOTCLP 26 / CDMOTCLP 26 - The Contours - Flashback (1990)
MOTCCD 27 - Former Ladies of The Supremes - Bouncing Back (NR)
MOTCLP 28 / CDMOTCLP 28 - The Monitors - Grazing In The Grass (1990)
MOTCLP 29 / CDMOTCLP 29 - Kim Weston - Investigate (1990)
MOTCCD 30 - Billy Griffin - Technicolour (NR)
CDMOTCLP 31 - Various Artists - Motorcity Love Songs (1990)
CDMOTCLP 32 - Various Artists - Motorcity Footstompers (1990)
CDMOTCLP 33 - Various Artists - Motorcity Duets (1990)
CDMOTCLP 34 - Various Artists - Motorcity Fingersnappers (1990)
CDMOTCLP 35 - Various Artists - Motorcity Summer Swingbeats (1990)
CDMOTCLP 36 - Various Artists - Motorcity Collector's Album (1990)
MOTCLP 37 / CDMOTCLP 37 - Marv Johnson - Come To Me (1990)
MOTCLP 38 / CDMOTCLP 38 - The Marvelettes - Now! (1990)
MOTCLP 39 / CDMOTCLP 39 - The Elgins - Take The Train(1990)
MOTCLP 40 / CDMOTCLP 40 - Mary Wells - Keeping My Mind On Love (1990)
MOTCLP 41 / CDMOTCLP 41 - Various Artists - Motorcity Beach Music (1990)
MOTCLP 42 / CDMOTCLP 42 - Carolyn Crawford - Heartaches (1990)
MOTCLP 43 / CDMOTCLP 43 - The Velvelettes - One Door Closes (1990)
MOTCLP 44 / CDMOTCLP 44 - Frances Nero - Out On The Floor (1991)
CDMOTCLP 45 - Bettye LaVette - Not Gonna Happen Twice (1991)
MOTCLP 46 / CDMOTCLP 46 - Bobby Taylor & the Vancouvers - Find My Way Back (1990)
MOTCLP 47 / CDMOTCLP 47 - Various Artists - Mixed Groups Of The Motorcity (1991)
MOTCLP 48 - Richard "Popcorn" Wylie - Lifeline (NR)
CDMOTCLP 49 - G. C. Cameron - Right Or Wrong (1991)
CDMOTCLP 50 - Hattie Littles - The Right Direction (1991)
CDMOTCLP 51 - Various Artists - Divas (2CD, 1991)
CDMOTCLP 52 - Various Artists - Garage Grooves Of Detroit (1991)
CDMOTCLP 53 - Various Artists - Motorcity Blue-Eyed Soul - (1991)
CDMOTCLP 54 - Various Artists - The Supreme Ladies (1991)
CDMOTCLP 55 - Various Artists - Motorcity Magic (1991)
CDMOTCLP 56 - Frankie Gaye - My Brother (1991)
CDMOTCLP 57 - Various Artists - Nowhere To Run (1991)
CDMOTCLP 58 - Various Artists - Soul Men Of Detroit (2CD, 1991)
CDMOTCLP 59 - Brenda Holloway - All It Takes (1991)
CDMOTCLP 60 - Linda Griner - Bitter End (1991)
CDMOTCLP 61 - Various Artists - Cream Of The Crop (1991)
CDMOTCLP 62 - Joe Stubbs - Round And Round (1991)
MOTCCD 63 - Various Artists - Motorcity Ballads (1992)
MOTCCD 64 - Various Artists - Uptight (1991)
MOTCCD 65 - Pat Lewis - Separation (1991)
MOTCCD 66 - Liz Lands - Stick Together (NR)
MOTCCD 67 - Various Artists - Divas II (1991)
MOTCCD 68 - The Andantes - Fire Power (NR)
MOTCCD 69 - J. J. Barnes - Try It One More Time (1991)
MOTCCD 70 - Various Artists - Motorcity Beach Party (1991)
MOTCCD 71 - Frances Nero - Footsteps Following Me (1991)
MOTCCD 72 - The Lovetones - Turn This Heart Around (1991)
MOTCCD 73 - Edwin Starr - Where Is The Sound (1991)
MOTCCD 74 - Jake Jacas - Two Way Street (NR)
MOTCCD 75 - The Elgins - Sensational (1992)
MOTCCD 76 -  The Fantastic Four - Back In Circulation (1992)
MOTCCD 77 - Saundra Edwards - Tow-Away Zone (NR)
MOTCCD 78 - Various Artists - Cream OF The Crop, Vol. 2 (1992)
MOTCCD 79 - Hattie Littles - Borderline (1992)
MOTCCD 80 - Joe Stubbs - Pressure Point (1992)
MOTCCD 81 - Various Artists - Tearing Up The Dancefloor (1992)
MOTCCD 82 - Louvain Demps - Better Times (1992)
MOTCCD 83 - Various Artists - Motorcity a GoGo (1992)
MOTCCD 84 - Kim Weston - Talking Loud (NR)
MOTCCD 85 - Various Artists - Motorcity Memories (1992)
MOTCCD 86 - Barbara Randolph - Breaking Into My Heart (1992)
MOTCCD 87 - Various Artists - Dancing In The Key Of Life (1992)
MOTCCD 88 - The Contours - Revenge (NR)
MOTCCD 99 - J. J. Barnes - Happy Road (NR)

Sources
http://rateyourmusic.com/label/motorcity/
http://www.myspace.com/ian_levine

Discographies of British record labels